Lots of Shows in a Row was a concert tour by Canadian electronic music producer, Deadmau5, to promote his eighth studio album W:/2016ALBUM/, with support from British producer and DJ Feed Me.
The tour initially took place just in North America but later toured elsewhere. The tour also features Deadmau5's new "Cube 2.1" stage.

An extension to the concert tour (in Canada) was announced by Mau5trap in July 2017, dubbed "Lots of Shows in a Row Pt 2". The tour concluded on October 31, 2017.

Average Set lists

Leg 1 (USA)
 "Imaginary Friends"
 "Three Pound Chicken Wing" / "Beneath with Me"
 "Avaritia" / "Where Phantoms Sleep 04"
 "Phantoms Can't Hang" / "Deus Ex Machina"
 "Acedia" / "Stay"
 "My Pet Coelacanth" / "Let Go"
 "Moar Ghosts 'n' Stuff" / "Doin' Ya Thang"
 "Ghosts 'n' Stuff"
 "Maths"
 "Maths" (Cobra Effect Remix)
 "2448"
 "Cat Thruster"
 "Legendary"
 "Snowcone"
 "No Problem"
 "Polaris"
 "The Veldt"
 "Strobe"
 "Raise Your Weapon (Noisia Remix)"

Leg 2 (Rest of World) 

 "Imaginary Friends"
 "Three Pound Chicken Wing" / "Beneath with Me"
 "Avaritia"
 "Fn Pig"
 "The Veldt (Tommy Tash Remix)"
 "Maths  (Cobra Effect Remix)"
 "Some Chords (Dillon Francis Remix)"
 "My Pet Coelacanth" / "Stay"
 "Moar Ghosts n' Stuff"
 "Ghosts 'n' Stuff"
 "Harder, Better, Faster, Stronger" (cover of Daft Punk)
 "Where My Keys"
 "Polaris"
 "Strobe"

This setlist is just taken from 1 concert during that section of the tour, and may not represent the entire tour.

Tour dates
Dates and venues taken from https://web.archive.org/web/20170516131405/http://live.deadmau5.com/

References

External links 
live.deadmau5.com

2017 concert tours
Deadmau5